Portulacaria longipedunculata (previously Ceraria longipedunculata or Ceraria kaokoensis) is a small-leaved succulent plant found in the far north of Namibia and into southern Angola.

Description
It is a soft-wooded, deciduous shrub with long, thin, succulent leaves and bisexual flowers.

References

longipedunculata
Flora of Angola
Flora of Namibia